Subsequent to her loss of the 2016 United States presidential election, Hillary Clinton retired from electoral politics and has since engaged in a number of activities.

Attendance at the Trump inauguration

In their respective roles as a former president and a former first lady, Bill and Hillary Clinton attended the inauguration of Donald Trump with their daughter, Chelsea. The morning of the inauguration Clinton wrote on her Twitter account, "I'm here today to honor our democracy & its enduring values, I will never stop believing in our country & its future."

Political actions
Clinton delivered a St. Patrick's Day speech in Scranton, Pennsylvania, on March 17, 2017. In it, alluding to reports that she had being seen taking walks in the woods around Chappaqua following her loss in the presidential election, Clinton indicated her readiness to emerge from "the woods" and become politically active again. However, the following month she confirmed she would not seek public office again. She reiterated her comments in March 2019 and stated she would not run for president in 2020.

In May 2017, Clinton announced the formation of Onward Together, a new political action committee that she wrote is "dedicated to advancing the progressive vision that earned nearly 66 million votes in the last election". During 2017, she spoke out on a number of occasions against Republican plans to repeal the Affordable Care Act and replace it with the American Health Care Act, which she called "a disastrous bill" and a "shameful failure of policy & morality by GOP". In response to the Khan Shaykhun chemical attack, Clinton said the U.S. should take out Bashar al-Assad's airfields and thereby "prevent him from being able to use them to bomb innocent people and drop sarin gas on them".

On April 28, 2020, Clinton endorsed the presumptive Democratic nominee, former Vice President Joe Biden, for president in the 2020 election and she addressed the 2020 Democratic National Convention in August. On October 28, 2020, Clinton announced that she was on the 2020 Democratic slate of electors for the state of New York. After Biden and Kamala Harris won New York State, thereby electing the Democratic elector slate, Clinton and her husband served as members of the 2020 United States Electoral College and cast the first of the state's electoral votes for Biden and Harris.

Comments on President Trump
On May 2, 2017, Clinton said Trump's use of Twitter "doesn't work" when pursuing important negotiations. "Kim Jong Un ... [is] always interested in trying to get Americans to come to negotiate to elevate their status and their position". Negotiations with North Korea should not take place without "a broader strategic framework to try to get China, Japan, Russia, South Korea, to put the kind of pressure on the regime that will finally bring them to the negotiating table with some kind of realistic prospect for change." While delivering the commencement speech at her alma mater Wellesley College on May 26, Clinton asserted President Trump's 2018 budget proposal was "a con" for underfunding domestic programs. On June 1, when President Trump announced the withdrawal of the U.S. from the Paris Agreement, Clinton tweeted that it was a "historic mistake".

On September 29, 2019, in an interview with CBS News Sunday Morning, Clinton described Trump as a "threat" to the country's standing in the world, describing him as a "corrupt human tornado". She also described Trump as an "illegitimate president", despite him having won the election. While recognizing she had indeed lost to Trump, she said he was "illegitimate" because she asserted that his election had been assisted by voting restrictions in certain states and Russian influence efforts.

Comments on politics during the Biden administration

In March 2021, Clinton voiced her support for the United States Senate to abolish the Senate filibuster if it proves necessary to do so in order to pass voting rights legislation. Clinton called the Senate filibuster "another Jim Crow relic".

In a May 2021 interview with The Guardian, Clinton called for a "global reckoning" with disinformation, and for the accountability of major social media platforms such as Facebook.

Writing career

Books

Clinton's third memoir, What Happened, an account of her loss in the 2016 election, was released on September 12, 2017. A book tour and a series of interviews and personal appearances were arranged for the launch. What Happened sold 300,000 copies in its first week, less than her 2003 memoir, Living History, but triple the first-week sales of her previous memoir, 2014's Hard Choices. Simon & Schuster announced that What Happened had sold more e-books in its first-week than any nonfiction e-book since 2010. As of December 10, 2017, the book had sold 448,947 hardcover copies.

An announcement was made in February 2017 that efforts were under way to render her 1996 book It Takes a Village as a picture book. Marla Frazee, a two-time winner of the Caldecott Medal, was announced as the illustrator. Clinton had worked on it with Frazee during her 2016 presidential election campaign. The result was published on the same day of publication as What Happened. The book is aimed at preschool-aged children, although a few messages are more likely better understood by adults.

In October 2019, The Book of Gutsy Women: Favorite Stories of Courage and Resilience, a book Clinton co-wrote with her daughter Chelsea, was published. In February 2021, Clinton announced that she was co-writing her first fiction book with Louise Penny. The book, a political mystery thriller, is titled State of Terror and was released in October 2021.

Op-eds
Clinton has also written occasional op-eds in the years since her 2016 election defeat. In September 2018, The Atlantic published an article written by Clinton titled "American Democracy Is In Crisis". In April 2019, The Washington Post published an op-ed by Clinton calling for congress to be, "deliberate, fair, and fearless" in responding to the Mueller Report. In their November/December 2020 issue, Foreign Affairs published a piece by Clinton titled "A National Security Reckoning". On January 11, 2021, following the January 6 storming of the United States Capitol, an op-ed by Clinton titled "Trump should be impeached. But that alone won’t remove white supremacy from America." was published in The Washington Post. In July 2021, Democracy Docket published an op-ed by Clinton on Republican efforts to restrict voting following the 2020 presidential election. In February 2022, The Atlantic published an op-ed coauthored by Clinton and Dan Schwerin accusing Republicans of assisting Vladimir Putin and Xi Jinping's goals "by attacking the rule of law." In March 2022, after the death of former Secretary of State Madeleine Albright, The New York Times published a guest opinion essay by Clinton on Albright's vision.

Media ventures
Clinton collaborated with director Nanette Burstein on the documentary film Hillary, which was released on Hulu in March 2020.

On September 29, 2020, Clinton launched an interview podcast in collaboration with iHeartRadio titled You and Me Both.

In 2022, Apple TV+ released the television series Gutsy, which was created by Clinton and her daughter Chelsea as an offshoot of their book series. Clinton is also slated to be an executive producer of a drama series about the fight for women's suffrage in the United States titled The Woman's Hour. The series, based upon Elaine Weiss' book of the same name, will air on The CW.

Chancellor of Queen's University Belfast (2020–present)
On January 2, 2020, it was announced that Clinton would take up the position of Chancellor at Queen's University Belfast. Clinton became the 11th and first female chancellor of the university, filling the position that had been vacant since 2018 after the death of her predecessor, Thomas J. Moran. Commenting on taking up the position, she said that "the university is making waves internationally for its research and impact and I am proud to be an ambassador and help grow its reputation for excellence". Queen's Pro-Chancellor Stephen Prenter said that Clinton on her appointment "will be an incredible advocate for Queen's" who can act as an "inspirational role model". However, her inauguration was protested by some students.

Other activities
In October 2017, Clinton was awarded an honorary doctorate from Swansea University, whose College of Law was renamed the Hillary Rodham Clinton School of Law in her honor. In October 2018, Hillary and Bill Clinton announced plans for a 13-city speaking tour in various cities in the United States and Canada between November 2018 and May 2019. Hillary was awarded an Honorary Doctorate in law (LLD) at Queen's University Belfast on October 10, 2018, after giving a speech on Northern Ireland and the impacts of Brexit at Whitla Hall, Belfast. In June 2018, Trinity College Dublin awarded her with an honorary doctorate (LLD). In September 2021 she was awarded an honorary doctorate of civil law by the University of Oxford.

A package that contained a pipe bomb was sent to Clinton's home in New York on October 24, 2018. It was intercepted by the Secret Service. Similar packages were sent to several other Democratic leaders and to CNN.

See also
Hillary Clinton's tenure as First Lady of the United States
US Senate career of Hillary Clinton
Hillary Clinton's tenure as Secretary of State
Hillary Clinton's tenures as First Lady of Arkansas
Legal career of Hillary Clinton
Post-presidency of Bill Clinton

References

Hillary Clinton
Clinton, Hillary
Clinton, Hillary